Daniel J. Solove (born 1972) is a professor of law at the George Washington University Law School. He is well known for his academic work on privacy and for popular books on how privacy relates with information technology.

Solove wrote three books about privacy that had been published from 2004 to 2008. Among other works, he authored The Future of Reputation: Gossip, Rumor and Privacy on the Internet, and The Digital Person: Technology and Privacy In the Information Age.  Solove has been quoted by the media outlets including The New York Times, The Washington Post, The Wall Street Journal, USA Today, Chicago Tribune, the Associated Press, ABC, CBS, NBC, CNN, and NPR. He is also a member of the organizing committee of the Privacy and Security Academy and the Privacy Law Salon.

In 2011 Tony Doyle wrote in The Journal of Value Inquiry that Solove "has established himself as one of the leading privacy theorists writing in English today."

Selected publications
Books:
The Digital Person: Technology and Privacy in the Information Age (2004)
Privacy, Information and Technology, 2nd Edition (2006)
The Future of Reputation: Gossip, Rumor, and Privacy on the Internet (2007)
Understanding Privacy (2008)
Nothing to Hide: The False Tradeoff between Privacy and Security (2011)

Text Books:
Daniel Solove, Paul M. Schwartz (2009) Privacy and the Media, First Edition
Daniel Solove, Paul M. Schwartz (2009) Privacy, Information and Technology, Second Edition
Daniel Solove, Paul M. Schwartz (2009) Information Privacy Law, Third Edition
Daniel Solove, Paul M. Schwartz (2011) Privacy Law Fundamentals

Journal articles:
"A TAXONOMY OF PRIVACY." (Archive) University of Pennsylvania Law Review. January 2006. Volume 154, Issue 3. p. 477-560.
"'I've Got Nothing to Hide' and Other Misunderstandings of Privacy." (Archive) George Washington University School of Law. 2007.

See also

 Nothing to hide argument

Notes

References
 Doyle, Tony. "Daniel J. Solove, Nothing to Hide: The False Tradeoff between Privacy and Security" (book review). The Journal of Value Inquiry Volume 46, Issue 1. p. 107-112. Published online on 19 November 2011. ISSN 0022-5363. DOI 10.1007/s10790-011-9303-z. Available at ProQuest.

George Washington University Law School faculty
1972 births
Living people
Washington University in St. Louis alumni
Yale Law School alumni
Scholars of privacy law
American legal scholars